Stephan Ernst Schmidheiny (born 29 October 1947) is a Swiss entrepreneur, philanthropist and advocate of sustainable development.  In 2019, his net worth was estimated by Forbes to be $2.3 billion. He's also well known for being convicted over his role in the Italian asbestos scandal.

Life
Stephan Ernest Schmidheiny was born in Balgach, St. Gallen, Switzerland, on 29 October 1947 as a fourth generation member of one of the key industrial families in Switzerland and completed his Law studies with a doctorate at the University of Zurich in 1972.

From 1974 until 2002, Stephan Schmidheiny was married to Ruth Schmidheiny (Administrator of the Daros Latinamerica AG from 1974 until 2002). He has a son and a daughter with Ruth and currently lives in Hurden, Switzerland. Since 2012, he has been married to Dr. Viktoria Schmidheiny-Werner.

Schmidheiny is an advocate and leader in the field of sustainable development.

Career

Eternit / Exit from Asbestos, Reflection and Legal Disputes
In 1972, Stephan Schmidheiny started his business career at Eternit. In 1976, at the age of 29, he was named CEO of the Swiss Eternit Group. According to his brother Thomas Schmidheiny, their father Max Schmidheiny decided to divide his industrial empire into two halves: asbestos for Stephan, cement for Thomas. As a result of this split of activities, Stephan Schmidheiny inherited Eternit.

According to his official biography, he ended the company's use of asbestos in 1986. Five years before in 1981, Schmidheiny, then Chairman, announced Eternit's intention to dispense entirely with its involvement in asbestos production and distribution, far ahead of the 2005 European-wide asbestos ban. Subsequently, Eternit worked to develop and fund research to develop new fiber blends to replace asbestos. In 1984, a majority of Eternit products were manufactured asbestos free.

Since 2009, due to his involvement in his family's industrial dynasty and despite his efforts to exit from asbestos, Stephan Schmidheiny has been involved in trials in Italy, one for environmental disaster and another for voluntary manslaughter, both connected to the employ of asbestos in the factories of Eternit. In the first trial Stephan Schmidheiny was sentenced to 16 years imprisonment on February 13, 2012. On June 3, 2013, the judgment given in February was not only confirmed, but also increased to 18 years imprisonment  for environmental damage by the Turin Appeal Court, In November 2014, it was ruled that the statute of limitations had passed. In 2014, Schmidheiny was acquitted of the charges for alleged negligent behavior in Italy. 
In 2015, a second trial called "Eternit Bis" began, Stephan Schmidheiny defended against the accusation of voluntary manslaughter. On November 29, 2016 the allegations raised in Eternit Bis were dismissed by the court in Turin and the case closed. Some legal proceedings regarding negligent homicide are still possible, e.g. in Vercelli, Reggio Emilia, Naples as well as in Turin 

Schmidheiny has emphasized that his involvement with the Eternit group was long before the health risks of asbestos were understood, and long before production was prohibited in Italy; this ban did not happen until 1992. He admitted in an interview in 2015 that the strain from the legal proceedings in Italy had deeply affected him. Later, however, he felt the proceedings had become absurd, especially after an Italian judge compared him to Hitler and his actions comparable with “the final solution”.
Beyond the aforementioned legal proceedings, Stephan Schmidheiny set up funds for victims of asbestos-related diseases in South Africa and Italy, as these countries had no successor company to Eternit, which could bear the financial consequences of asbestos exposure.

Sentenced for Involuntary Manslaughter 
In May 2019, Stephan Schmidheiny, the former majority shareholder in Italian asbestos company Eternit Genova, has been sentenced to four years in prison by a Turin court for the death of two workers.

The ruling marks the latest twist in a decade-long battle between Schmidheiny, the Italian government, former Eternit workers and residents of towns near the company’s asbestos plants. Prosecutor Gianfranco Colace said the ruling was the “first step” in setting a precedent on deaths from cancer and pulmonary diseases, which can take years to develop after contact with asbestos fibers.

Other engagements
While Schmidheiny withdrew from asbestos production and Eternit, he invested in new industrial segments, building up a multinational conglomerate of shareholdings by adding enterprises in the areas of forestry, banking, consumer goods, power generation, as well as electronic and optical equipment. He also joined the boards of directors of leading companies such as ABB Asea Brown Boveri, Nestlé, Swatch, and UBS AG.

In 1985 Schmidheiny supported Nicolas Hayek in his bid for the Swiss watch holding company Société de Microélectronique et d'Horlogerie(SMH), which resulted in the rescue of the Swiss watch industry. Later from this valuable alliance, the present day Swatch Group was formed.

In 1987, as an anchor shareholder in Brown, Boveri & Cie (BBC), Schmidheiny co-organized a merger of BBC with ASEA of Sweden.  This led to the creation of the newly positioned, market leader in its segment, ASEA Brown Boveri, today known as ABB Group.

In 1987, he took over two-thirds of the capital of Landis + Gyr from the family shareholders, as they could provide no successor for leadership. In doing so,  Schmidheiny was aware that major changes were necessary, as the company was not doing well. Schmidheiny restructured the company. In 1995, the company was taken over by the Swiss company Elektrowatt.

Philanthropy
Philanthropic pursuits have been important to Schmidheiny and since the 1990s, he has devoted his life to these pursuits. Schmidheiny is an advocate and leader in the field of sustainable development. He served as adviser on sustainability to the United Nations as well as to the OECD.

In the 1980s he created FUNDES, an organization that supports the development of small and medium-sized enterprises in several Latin American countries. According to recent Swiss accounts, Schmidheiny began buying Chilean forest land in 1982, and he now owns over 120,000 hectares in Southern Chile, near Concepción, land which the Mapuche Indians claim has been theirs since time immemorial. The Mapuche charge that some of the land Schmidheiny bought was stolen from them during the Pinochet dictatorship, using that regime's standard techniques of intimidation, torture, and murder.

In 2019 Forbes put Schmidheiny in the list of the world's most generous philanthropists outside of the US.

Rio Summit 1992
In 1990 Schmidheiny was appointed chief adviser for business and industry to the secretary general of the United Nations Conference on Environment and Development (UNCED), better known as the Rio de Janeiro Earth Summit of 1992. The conference took place in 1992, with 172 governments participating.

As chief advisor to this conference, Schmidheiny created a forum in which leading businessmen from all parts of the world developed a business perspective on environment and development challenges. This forum later became the World Business Council for Sustainable Development (WBCSD), an organization that today counts the world's 160 most important companies as its members. Schmidheiny was elected honorary chairman, in recognition of his pioneering role in the phase-out of production of building materials containing asbestos.

Following his involvement in the Rio Summit, Schmidheiny authored the book Change of Course: Global Business Prospects for Development and the Environment, published by MIT Press in 1992. His book offers an extensive analysis of how businesses can make sustainable development their focus, his book has been translated into fifteen languages. He also contributed to Financing Change: The Financial Community, Eco-efficiency, and Sustainable Development  also published by MIT Press.

AVINA Foundation
In the 1990s Schmidheiny established the Fundación AVINA , which contributes to sustainable development in Latin America by encouraging productive alliances among social and business leaders and today is a leading player in that field.

Schmidheiny's foundation pioneered a South American microfinance system similar to that of Muhammad Yunus whose widely praised system benefits the citizens of Bangladesh. Stephan Schmidheiny's charitable activities in South America have meant a donation of over one billion US dollars to the region.

After the creation of VIVA Trust in 2003, Schmidheiny retired from all of his executive functions, including his positions in GrupoNueva  and AVINA.

Other philanthropy
In 1993, Schmidheiny in memory of his late brother Alexander, who died in 1992, founded the Alexander Schmidheiny Foundation  with the inheritance from his brother's estate. This Foundation is active in the St. Gallen Rhine Valley.

Schmidheiny supports arts and culture through a series of initiatives. He has developed and expanded the art collection of his deceased brother Alexander, the Daros Collection. The Daros Collection, based in Zurich is a substantial collection of North American and European art from the second half of the 20th century.

Stephan is a contributor to the Zurich Chamber Orchestra and other important cultural institutions.

In Gstaad, he and his wife Victoria are seeking to build a new cultural center called Les Arts Gstaad.

On Schmidheiny's website is possible to find a specific section about his "philanthropic activities" and another about his engagement for "ecological efficience".

According to information from Fundacion MarViva, Schmidheiny has played a foundational role in starting this organization that bridges scientific research with public activism for the promotion of marine habitat near and in the Costa Rica Thermal Dome, with an organizational presence in Costa Rica, Panama, and Columbia.

SCAM warning
Do not fall for SCAM e-mails containing a Google or Yahoo address with the following or similar content:

Hi,

Mein Name ist Stephan Ernst Schmidheiny, ein Schweizer Unternehmer, Philanthrop und Verfechter einer nachhaltigen Entwicklung. Ich bin einer der erfolgreichsten Unternehmer der Welt in der Schweiz und glaube fest daran, während des Lebens zu geben.“ Hatte ich eine Idee, die sich nie geändert hat? dass Sie Ihr Vermögen einsetzen sollten, um Menschen zu helfen, und ich habe beschlossen, {€ 600.000,00} Sechshunderttausend Euro an zufällig ausgewählte Personen weltweit zu spenden. Nach Erhalt dieser E-Mail sollten Sie sich zu den Glücklichen zählen. Ihre E-Mail-Adresse wurde zufällig online ausgewählt. Bitte melden Sie sich so bald wie möglich bei mir, damit ich weiß, dass Ihre E-Mail-Adresse gültig ist.

Besuchen Sie dies: https://en.wikipedia.org/wiki/Stephan_Schmidheiny oder Sie können meinen Namen googeln, um weitere Informationen zu erhalten: ( Stephan Ernst Schmidheiny ).

Senden Sie Ihre Antwort an (…), damit ich Ihnen weitere Einzelheiten zu dieser Spende mitteilen kann.

Ich werde auf Ihre Antwort warten.

Awards
Schmidheiny has received a large number of prizes and awards in recognition of his leadership and his contribution to sustainable development.

These include a 1993 honorary doctorate from the Instituto Centroamerica de Administración de Empresas (INCAE), Costa Rica  and the same honorary doctorate in 1996 by Yale University. and in 2001 by Rollins College, Florida, and the Andrés Bello Catholic University (UCAB), Caracas.

In 2001, Schmidheiny received the Zayed International Prize for the Environment for "Environmental Action Leading to Positive Change in Society".

In 2007, during the PODER Green Forum, Schmidheiny was awarded a Philanthropy Award.

References

External links
 Official website of Stephan Schmidheiny

1947 births
Living people
Stephan
Swiss billionaires
Swiss businesspeople